Lingzhi Gewog (Dzongkha: གླིང་གཞི་) is a gewog (village block) of Thimphu District, Bhutan. Lingzhi Gewog, along with Naro and Soe Gewogs, is part of Lingzhi Dungkhag (sub-district).

References 

Gewogs of Bhutan
Thimphu District